The bipartisan United States Senate Taiwan Caucus focuses exclusively on improving American-Taiwanese relations. It currently has 33 members in the 117th congress. Its counterpart in the House is the Congressional Taiwan Caucus.

History
The Caucus was established on September 17, 2003. Founding members of the caucus are: Senators George Allen (R-VA), Tim Johnson (D-SD), Byron Dorgan (D-ND), Dick Durbin (D-IL), Ben Nelson (D-NE), Jay Rockefeller (D-WV), Kit Bond (R-MO), Jon Kyl (R-AZ), Jeff Sessions (R-AL), Saxby Chambliss (R-GA) and Jim Inhofe (R-OK). By November 2003 the caucus had 18 members, including Tom Daschle and Trent Lott. The Senate Taiwan caucus had 24 members in 2011, and was active in applying pressure to uphold Taiwanese interests during Hu Jintao's visit to the US in that year.

Members
There is no official source available to the public regarding the accurate list of the caucus. According to public information including news reports, this membership information is as of 2019.

Jim Inhofe (R-OK) Co-Chair 
Bob Menendez (D-NJ) Co-Chair
John Boozman (R-AR) 
Sherrod Brown (D-OH)
Richard Burr (R-NC) 
Bill Cassidy (R-LA) 
Susan Collins (R-ME)
John Cornyn (R-TX)
Tom Cotton (R-AR)
Dick Durbin (D-IL)
Lindsey Graham (R-SC)
Charles Grassley (R-IA)
Johnny Isakson (R-GA)
James Lankford (R-OK)
Joe Manchin (D-WV)
Edward Markey (D-MA)
Jerry Moran (R-KS)
Gary Peters (D-MI)
Mike Rounds (R-SD)
Charles Schumer (D-NY)
Tim Scott (R-SC)
Jon Tester (D-MT)
Roger Wicker (R-MS) 
Ron Wyden (D-OR)

References

Caucuses of the United States Congress
Taiwan–United States relations
2003 establishments in Washington, D.C.